The brown-fronted woodpecker (Dendrocoptes auriceps) is a species of bird in the family Picidae. It ranges across the northern regions of the Indian subcontinent, primarily the lower-to-middle altitudes of the Himalayas. It is found in Afghanistan, India, Nepal, Pakistan and Bhutan.

Some taxonomic authorities continue to place the species in Dendrocopos, while others place it genus Leiopicus.

Habitat
Its natural habitats are temperate forests and subtropical or tropical moist montane forests.

Description
A medium-sized, pied woodpecker with yellow in crown. White-barred (rather than spotted) black. Underparts, prominent black moustache extending to breast and black-streaked white underparts. Vent deep pink. In male forecrown brown, centre yellow, rear red with black rear neck. In female whole crown yellow.

References

brown-fronted woodpecker
Birds of Afghanistan
Birds of Pakistan
Birds of North India
Birds of Nepal
brown-fronted woodpecker
Taxonomy articles created by Polbot
Taxobox binomials not recognized by IUCN